Gao Zhikai (born 1962) is a Chinese lawyer, academic and media spokesman for the Chinese Communist Party (CCP). He is the Vice President of the Beijing based Center for China and Globalization (CCG), and Chair Professor of Soochow University. He was formerly a translator for the CCP leader Deng Xiaoping.

Biography
Gao graduated with a J.D. degree from Yale Law School. He received an M.A. in political science from Yale Graduate School. He graduated with a B.A. and M.A. in English Language and Literature from Soochow University and Beijing University of Foreign Studies respectively.

Gao was a translator for Deng Xiaoping from 1983 to 1988.

He is a Director of the China National Association of International Studies and an Executive Director of Beijing Private Equity Association. Gao is the vice president of the Center for China and Globalization.

According to Foreign Policy "Gao was once treated as a reputable interlocutor in U.S.-China relations."

Views

Hong Kong
In 2014 Gao condemned pro-democracy protests in Hong Kong as illegal and provocative. He supports the National Security Law and the continued integration of Hong Kong into China.

AUKUS
In September 2021 Gao referred to the AUKUS pact as a "gross violation of international law," claimed that "Armed with nuclear submarines, Australia itself will be a target for possible nuclear attacks in the future," and referred to Australians as "brainless." He also warned that Australia's moves towards nuclear-powered submarines would lead to the country "being targeted with nuclear weapons," in a future nuclear war. Gao repeated his warning to Australia during an interview on 60 Minutes Australia television programme in November 2021: "I would say the AUKUS deal in itself by enabling Australia to build nuclear submarines will have one big consequence for Australia, that is, Australia will no longer enjoy the benefit and the very rare privilege of not being targeted with nuclear weapons going forward." 

The interviewer challenged Gao by reminding him that Australia was planning to buy nuclear powered submarines and not nuclear armed submarines, and asked: "Why should Australia then be a target of nuclear weapons?" Dismissing the distinction, Gao insisted: "Listen to me: the tubes in the submarine can be armed with both nuclear warheads and conventional warheads. Now, in the heat of a battle or in the heat of a war, do you think Australia will allow inspections as to what kind of warhead you put into that big tube? I can bet you, in the heat of battle no one will pause – and the safe approach is to target Australia as a nuclear-armed country.

Taiwan
Gao supports "any means possible" to achieve Chinese unification.

In October 2021 Gao claimed that most supporters of Taiwanese independence were of Japanese descent. Gao then called for the ethnic cleansing of those of Japanese descent following any unification with Taiwan.

In August 2022 Gao argued that the "Chinese military’s mission is to liberate Taiwan."

COVID-19 

Gao believes that any search for the origins of the COVID-19 virus in China are part of "a conspiracy" because it "existed earlier than the outbreak of Wuhan in other parts of the world, including, most logically, in the United States, centering on Fort Detrick."

Peng Shuai 
In February 2022, Gao claimed on the Australian 60 Minutes Australia program that the Chinese tennis player Peng Shuai could not have been raped by a CCP official because of her physical athleticism as a professional athlete.

Other 
Gao opposes Scottish Independence and criticized the UK for allowing the 2014 Scottish independence referendum to happen at all.

In June 2021 Gao said that “The G7 and Nato have been distorted into anti-China platforms.”

Gao believes that NATO expansion and potential missile defense system emplacements were the cause of the 2022 Russian invasion of Ukraine. According to the South China Morning Post "He said the same scenario could occur between England and Scotland, if a country like Russia wanted to deploy nuclear weapons on Scottish territory." He has claimed that Ukraine joining NATO would "trigger armageddon."

References

Further reading 
Biographies
 

Opinion pieces on/by Gao
 
 
 

Living people
Yale Law School alumni
Beijing Foreign Studies University alumni
1962 births
Soochow University (Suzhou) alumni
Yale Graduate School of Arts and Sciences alumni